The men's pole vault event at the 2019 African Games was held on 29 August in Rabat.

Results

References

Pole
African Games